Eturnagaram is a village and a mandal in Mulugu district in the state of Telangana in India.

Dolmen

There is a megalithic dolmen graves site near Eturnagaram in Eturnagaram Wildlife Sanctuary. .

Wildlife sanctuary

The mandal area is surrounded by a deep forest which includes a southern tropical dry deciduous type of teak and its associates including thiruman, maddi, and bamboo, while the fauna includes several endangered species including tiger, sloth bear, four-horned antelope, chinkara and black buck. It was declared a wildlife sanctuary in 1953 because of its bio-diversity. River Godavari also passes through the outskirts of the village.

Climate
The climate is usually hot around the year. The temperature often reaches 43°C during summer. There is a sufficient rainfall in the every year. The annual average rainfall is about 1000 mm

References 

Mandals in Mulugu district
Villages in Mulugu district